Pious Patric Rozario, known as "Patric Rozario" (born 11 July 1964, Selangor, Malaysia), is an artist and designer based in Doha, Qatar. Rozario's trades as "Own a Rozario". He designs and creates artistic metal panels made of aluminium coated with epoxy resin. The panels are decorated with embedded pearls, Swarovski crystals, gems and semi-precious stones. He also works with brass, copper, silver, zinc and gold.

Personal life and education
Rozario was born in Selangor on 11 July 1964, the eldest child of Catholic parents. Rozario's father moved from India to Malaysia in 1957. He was an agricultural officer for rubber and palm oil estates in Sandakan. Rozario attended St. Gabriel's Primary School. At age ten years, Rozario was enrolled at a Christian school in Trivandrum, Kerala, India. Rosario was a boarder at Sarvodaya Vidyalaya. Rozario attended Mar Ivanios College in Kerala to study science before returning to Malaysia in 1986. After finishing his schooling, Rozario studied maritime radio telegraphy at the Maritime Malaysian Academy. Rozario then received a diploma in marketing management from the Institute of Marketing Malaysia in Kuala Lumpur. Rozario received a master's degree in communication management from the University of South Australia, Adelaide. Rozario married in May 1993 and has two sons.

Career
In 1987, Rozario was employed for eight years as a radio officer by Neptune Orient Lines. On returning to Kuala Lumpur in 1995, he opened an advertising design company, "Grafik Trafik Sdn, Bhd" which traded until 2004. In 2005, Rozario moved to Doha where he was employed as a senior creative officer at the United Development Company. He was responsible for the marketing plans and programs for "The Pearl-Qatar" brand.

In 2009, Rozario was employed as a marketing manager at Tanween (Barwa Real Estate), a real estate development company. Rozario then worked as a chief strategist for Fahrenheit Communications, Bangalore for a year and then as a general manager for Mohammed Nasr Al Misnad Trading WLL.

Rozario started an in-home art school, called "Art Explorers", teaching children and adults. In 2015, Rozario opened Aesthetic Arts Ltd. UK.

Art
Rosario gained notability as an artist in 2002. He was invited to present his work at a group exhibition entitled Five Expressions. Rozario creates pictures on poster board using coloured thread. He uses glue and acrylic paint to hold the threads in place. Rosario presented his work at the gallery "The Art Publisher", Bangsar and at a gallery in Petaling Jaya. In February 2008, Rozario painted a portrait of Plácido Domingo and presented it to him during a performance at the Pearl hotel in Kuala Lumpur.

In March 2011, Rozario presented his work at the Al Hosh art gallery in Souq Waqif, Doha and then at Café Ceramique in Doha. The collection was called "Cloud Dance". It consisted of works in acrylic paint of Doha's architectural landmarks including Museum of Islamic Art, the Sheraton Doha Hotel, and the Katara Cultural Village. In August 2011, Rozario presented his collection, Swarovski Towers to Moza bint Nasser the first lady of Qatar at the Al Wajbah palace.

In 2012, Rosario started works called Pearlappetite. The works consisted of pearls, semi-precious stones, and crystals set on colourful ceramic and glass plates. In October 2012, H.E. Dato' Ahmad Jazri Mohamed Johar, the ambassador of Malaysia to Qatar commissioned Rozario to create a Pearlappetite gift to present to Datin Paduka Seri Hajjah Rosmah Mansor, the first lady of Malaysia. In 2012, Rozario assisted sixty-two children in Doha to create gifts of art to present to the families of people who died in the Villagio Mall fire of May that year. In the same year, Rozario became a founding member of the Visual Arts Forum India (VAFI) which aims to provide a platform to elevate Indian visual artists in Qatar. Also in 2012, Rozario published a blog about his photographic collection, "Man and his machine". In February 2014, Rozario's 'Pearlappetite' collection was published as a coffee table book.

In March 2014, Rozario collaborated with three other artists to produce an "Eco Pond" made from domestic plastic waste at The Pearl hotel, Qatar. In the same year, Rozario was selected as an appraiser for Destination Imagination Qatar, a non-profit organization for youth development.

References

External links
 Patric Rozario's blog Wordpress.

1964 births
Living people
Creative directors
Malaysian artists
University of South Australia alumni